Sangu (also called Kisangu, Kisango, Kirori, Eshisango, Rori, and Sango) is a language spoken in Tanzania by approximately 75,000 (1987) Sangu people.

References

Languages of Tanzania
Northeast Bantu languages